(born in Yamanashi Prefecture, on 14 October 1974) is a Japanese former rugby union player and currently coach.

Career
Amino first played rugby in 1993, for Kanto Gakuin University's rugby union team. In 1997 after his graduation, he would join NEC Green Rockets, playing for the club until the end of his career in 2010.

International career
Amino debuted for Japan during the test match against South Korea, on 2 July 2000, in Aomori. He was also part of the 2003 Rugby World Cup Japan squad, playing three matches in the tournament, with his last test cap being the pool stage match against United States in Gosford, on 27 October 2003.

Coaching career
After his retirement from played rugby in 2010, Amino would coach his former club NEC Green Rockets between 2010 and 2016.

References

External links
Masao Amino Top League profile
2019 ALL FOR JAPAN
Masao Amino international statistics at ESPN Scrum

1974 births
Kanto Gakuin University alumni
Japanese rugby union coaches
Japanese rugby union players
Sportspeople from Yamanashi Prefecture
Green Rockets Tokatsu players
Japan international rugby union players
Rugby union hookers
Living people